Trumpy may refer to:

People with the surname
Bjørn Trumpy (1900–1974), Norwegian physicist
Bob Trumpy (born 1945), American football player and broadcaster
Rudolf Trümpy (1921–2009), Swiss geologist

Others
Trumpy, extraterrestrial creature in the 1983 film The Pod People
Trumpy, character in the 2006 film Idlewild
John Trumpy & Sons, later name of John H. Mathis & Company